The white-fronted tyrannulet (Phyllomyias zeledoni) is a species of bird in the family Tyrannidae.  It is found in  Colombia, Costa Rica, Ecuador, Panama, Peru, and Venezuela. Its natural habitats are subtropical or tropical moist lowland forest and subtropical or tropical moist montane forest.

References

white-fronted tyrannulet
white-fronted tyrannulet
Taxa named by George Newbold Lawrence